The 4 × 50 metre mixed medley relay competition of the 2016 FINA World Swimming Championships (25 m) was held on 8 December 2016.

Records
Prior to the competition, the existing world and championship records were as follows.

Results

Heats
The heats were held at 11:53.

Final
The final was held at 20:20.

References

4 x 50 metre mixed medley relay
Mixed aquatics